Jerzy Bańczerowski (born on October 28, 1938, in Ożarów ) is a Polish professor of Philology.

Bańczerowski is a member of the Committee on Oriental Studies of the Polish Academy of Sciences, and has served as director of the Institute of Linguistics (1977-1991, 1994–2008), and head of the Department of General and Comparative Linguistics at Adam Mickiewicz University (1969-).

The main subjects of Bańczerowski's research are general and comparative linguistics, set theoretic axiomatization of linguistic theory, Finno-Ugric linguistics, and Asian languages. On his initiative, new specialties (in the field of philology) of studies were established at the Adam Mickiewicz University, including Finnish philology and ethnolinguistics.

Professional career

In 1961 Bańczerowski graduated from the Adam Mickiewicz University. In 1964, he defended his doctoral thesis on lentition (in Finnish). In 1968 Bańczerowski received his habilitation for the dissertation Konsonantenalternation im Ostlappischen unter dem Aspekt der Verstärkung - Lenierung. In 1981 he received an individual Award of the Minister of Science, Higher Education and Technology for achievements in the field of scientific research.

From 1984 Bańczerowski was a full professor. In 1989 he was awarded the Officer's Cross of the Order of Polonia Restituta, while on November 26, 2004, he was awarded the Commander's Cross. In 1986 he was also awarded the Medal of the National Education Commission and in 2000 the Friends of Thailand award.

References

Polish philologists
Members of the Polish Academy of Sciences
1938 births
Academic staff of Adam Mickiewicz University in Poznań
Living people